"M.A.G.I.C." is the second EP by the Swedish duo The Sound of Arrows. The song "M.A.G.I.C." was released as an EP in 2009 and was also available for free download from their record label's website. It was re-released in 2011 as a single, "Magic", with a new video.

The song is most easily recognized from the chorus, "The V-O-R-L-D is full of M-A-G-I-C," which features Hanna from Name The Pet.

Track listings

Personnel 
 The Sound of Arrows — lyrics, music, mixing (track: 6), production (track: 6)
 Henrik Von Euler — mixing (tracks: 1 to 5), production (tracks: 1 to 5)
 Lance And John — design and layout of artwork
 Einar Åkerlind/LPS — handwritten typography of artwork
 One Size Fits All — logo of artwork
 Edine Kwok — backing vocalist (tracks 1 to 5)
 Hanna Brandén — backing vocalist (tracks 1 to 5)
 Hugo Wikström — backing vocalist (tracks 1 to 5)
 Klara — backing vocalist (tracks 1 to 5)

Soundtracks 
 The song "M.A.G.I.C." was used in a television commercial for the Mitsubishi Outlander vehicle by Mitsubishi Motors.

References

2009 EPs
The Sound of Arrows albums